Frantz Bertin (born 30 May 1983) is a Haitian former professional footballer who played as a central defender.

Club career
Bertin was born in Paris, France. After beginning his career with Red Star FC, he finished his formation in Italy with Juventus FC.

In 2003, Bertin moved teams and countries again, signing for Racing de Santander in Spain. During his two-year stint with the Cantabrian club, he played mainly with the reserves, but still contributed with 15 games (13 starts) in the 2004–05 season as the team narrowly avoided La Liga relegation.

Bertin continued playing in the country in the following years, with CD Tenerife in the second division and Atlético Madrid B and Benidorm CF in the third. In the 2008 summer he joined FC Luzern in the Swiss Super League, but left in the following transfer window, signing with OFI Crete in Greece.

Shortly before the end of the January transfer deadline, after an unassuming spell in Cyprus, Bertin returned to Greece, joining Veria F.C. until the end of the season. He made his Superleague debut on 23 February, in a 2–0 away win against Skoda Xanthi FC.

International career
Bertin represented Haiti at the 2007 CONCACAF Gold Cup in the United States, and made his debut in the nation's final group stage game, a 0–2 loss against Canada. In February 2008 he played in a friendly with Venezuela, serving as warm-up for the 2010 FIFA World Cup qualifiers against the Netherlands Antilles, which ended with a 1–0 aggregate win – he appeared in the second leg, a 1–0 success in Willemstad – with Haiti thus progressing to the third round.

International goals
 (Haiti score listed first, score column indicates score after each Bertin goal)

References

External links

1983 births
Living people
French sportspeople of Haitian descent
Citizens of Haiti through descent
Footballers from Paris
Haitian footballers
Association football defenders
La Liga players
Segunda División players
Segunda División B players
Rayo Cantabria players
Racing de Santander players
CD Tenerife players
Atlético Madrid B players
Benidorm CF footballers
Swiss Super League players
FC Luzern players
Super League Greece players
Football League (Greece) players
OFI Crete F.C. players
Veria F.C. players
Panachaiki F.C. players
Apollon Pontou FC players
Cypriot First Division players
Alki Larnaca FC players
Indian Super League players
Mumbai City FC players
Haiti international footballers
2007 CONCACAF Gold Cup players
2009 CONCACAF Gold Cup players
2014 Caribbean Cup players
2015 CONCACAF Gold Cup players
Haitian expatriate footballers
Expatriate footballers in Spain
Expatriate footballers in Switzerland
Expatriate footballers in Greece
Expatriate footballers in Cyprus
Expatriate footballers in India
Haitian expatriate sportspeople in Spain
Haitian expatriate sportspeople in Switzerland
Haitian expatriate sportspeople in Greece
Haitian expatriate sportspeople in Cyprus
Haitian expatriate sportspeople in India
French expatriate sportspeople in Spain
French expatriate sportspeople in Switzerland
French expatriate sportspeople in Greece
French expatriate sportspeople in Cyprus
French expatriate sportspeople in India